Fernando Eurico de Barros Oliveira da Fonseca e Costa (also Fernando Costa, born 29 April 1985) is a Portuguese former swimmer, who specialized in long-distance freestyle events. He is a two-time Olympian, and currently holds the Portuguese record in the 1500 m freestyle from the 2007 Summer Universiade in Bangkok, Thailand. 

Costa made his first Portuguese team, as a 19-year-old, at the 2004 Summer Olympics in Athens, Greece, where he competed in the men's 1500 m freestyle. Swimming in last out of five heats, Costa closed out the field with an eighth-place finish and twenty-first overall in 15:32.55, more than thirty seconds behind the winner Yuri Prilukov of Russia.

At the 2008 Summer Olympics in Beijing, Costa qualified for the second time in the men's 1500 m freestyle, by clearing a FINA B-standard entry time of 15:16.22 from the 2007 Summer Universiade in Bangkok, Thailand. Costa challenged six other swimmers on the second heat, including three-time Olympians Dragoș Coman of Romania, and Nicolas Rostoucher of France. He raced to sixth place by two seconds behind Coman in 15:26.21. Costa failed to advance into the final for the second time, as he placed twenty-ninth overall in the prelims.

Costa is also a former member and a student assistant coach of the swimming team for the Wayne State Warriors, and a graduate of nutrition and food science at Wayne State University in Detroit, Michigan.

References

External links
Profile – Wayne State Warriors
NBC Olympics Profile

1985 births
Living people
Olympic swimmers of Portugal
Swimmers at the 2004 Summer Olympics
Swimmers at the 2008 Summer Olympics
Portuguese male freestyle swimmers
Wayne State Warriors athletes
Wayne State University alumni
Sportspeople from Porto
20th-century Portuguese people
21st-century Portuguese people